Helen Caceres (née Petinos; born 15 June 1993) is an Australian association football player, who currently plays for Melbourne City in the Australian W-League. She previously played for the Western Sydney Wanderers.

Playing career 
Petinos grew up in Western Sydney, and played her junior football in her hometown of Liverpool, New South Wales.  She then joined Marconi Stallions FC - where she made a name for herself in the NSW Premier League.  After nine years with the Stallions, she proceeded to sign her first W-League (Australia) contract with the Western Sydney Wanderers in 2012.

Petinos made her debut for the Western Sydney Wanderers on 17 November 2013 in a match against Canberra United. She made 11 appearances for the team during the 2013–14 W-League season and scored 1 goal during a 3–0 win against Perth Glory on 14 December 2013.

During the 2014–15 W-League season, Petinos made 12 appearances and scored 2 goals.

After spending four seasons at Western Sydney, as well as a year away from the W-League due to living overseas in United Arab Emirates, Petinos signed with Melbourne City for the 2018–19 W-League season.

Personal life 
Helen is married to Sydney FC midfielder Anthony Cáceres (married on 2 June 2018) whom she met at Westfields Sports High School.  She is of Greek descent.

They are the first wife and husband, to play at the same club in the A-League and the affiliated W-League (Australia).

References

Further reading
 Grainey, Timothy (2012), Beyond Bend It Like Beckham: The Global Phenomenon of Women's Soccer, University of Nebraska Press, 
 Stewart, Barbara (2012), Women's Soccer: The Passionate Game, Greystone Books,

External links 
 Western Sydney Wanderers player profile

1993 births
Living people
Australian women's soccer players
Western Sydney Wanderers FC (A-League Women) players
Melbourne City FC (A-League Women) players
A-League Women players
Australian people of Greek descent
Women's association football forwards